Peștera may refer to several places in Romania:

Peștera, a commune in Constanța County
Peștera, a village in Moieciu Commune, Brașov County
Peștera, a village in Dej city, Cluj County
Peștera, a village in Băița Commune, Hunedoara County
Peștera, a village in Petroşani city, Hunedoara County
Peștera, a village in Sălașu de Sus Commune, Hunedoara County
Peștera (Danube), a river in Constanța County, tributary of the Danube
Peștera, a river in Hunedoara County, tributary of the Căian

See also 
 Peștere (disambiguation)